William Widdrington may refer to:

 William Widdrington, 1st Baron Widdrington (1610–1651), English politician and soldier
 William Widdrington, 2nd Baron Widdrington (died 1675)
 William Widdrington, 3rd Baron Widdrington (1656–1695)
 William Widdrington, 4th Baron Widdrington (1678–1743), English peer and supporter of the Stuart claim to the English Crown

See also
Baron Widdrington